Hollingworth Reservoir is a former reservoir near Hollingworth, Tameside, Greater Manchester.  The reservoir straddles the Greater Manchester–Derbyshire border. It was constructed in 1854 as part of the Longdendale Chain, but was abandoned in 1987 and now forms part of the Swallows Wood nature reserve.

See also 
Arnfield Reservoir
Bottoms Reservoir (to the East)
List of dams and reservoirs in United Kingdom

References 

Reservoirs of the Peak District
Reservoirs in Greater Manchester
Former reservoirs